A compression fracture is a collapse of a vertebra. It may be due to trauma or due to a weakening of the vertebra (compare with burst fracture). This weakening is seen in patients with osteoporosis or osteogenesis imperfecta, lytic lesions from metastatic or primary tumors, or infection. In healthy patients, it is most often seen in individuals suffering extreme vertical shocks, such as ejecting from an ejection seat. Seen in lateral views in plain x-ray films, compression fractures of the spine characteristically appear as wedge deformities, with greater loss of height anteriorly than posteriorly and intact pedicles in the anteroposterior view.

Signs and symptoms
Acute fractures will cause severe back pain. Compression fractures which develop gradually, such as in osteoporosis, may initially not cause any symptoms, but will later often lead to back pain and loss of height.

Diagnosis
Compression fractures are usually diagnosed on spinal radiographs, where a wedge-shaped vertebra may be visible or there may be loss of height of the vertebra. In addition, bone density measurement may be performed to evaluate for osteoporosis. When a tumor is suspected as the underlying cause, or the fracture was caused by severe trauma, CT or MRI scans may be performed.

Treatment

Conservative treatment
 Back brace for support while the bone heals—either a Jewett brace for relatively stable and mild injuries, or a thoracic lumbar sacral orthosis (TLSO) for more severe ones.
 Opioids or non-steroidal anti-inflammatory drugs (NSAIDs) for pain. For osteoporotic patients, calcitonin may be helpful.

Surgical
 Kyphoplasty and vertebroplasty are minimally invasive procedures that inject cement into the bone of the back that is fractured. However, the data examining the effectiveness of these procedures is mixed.

References

Further reading

 
 Medscape article on lytic lesions
 Emedicine article on spinal metastasis

External links 

Bone fractures
Orthopedic problems